Tawahi is a city district in the city of Aden, located in the Aden Governorate in Yemen.

Etymology & History
The name Al-Tawahi is derived from the anglicized local Adeni dialect pronunciation of the word suburbs, the Tawahi district became known as "Steamer Point" during Aden's time as a British colony. It was urbanized by the British and planned as a modern port and was part of Aden Settlement.

Population

Its population in 2004 was about 52,984.

Notable people
David Buggé (born 1956), English cricketer and banker

References

Muhammad Abd al wali in Sana, ville ouverte mentions the city district.

Aden
Populated places in Aden Governorate
World War II sites in Aden